Los Osos (Spanish for "the bears") is an unincorporated town and census-designated place (CDP) in San Luis Obispo County, California. Located on the Central Coast of California, Los Osos had a population estimated to be 16,533 in 2019.

History

Northern Chumash people, known in their language as yak titʸu titʸu yak tiłhini, are the first inhabitants of the Los Osos area, as well as much of San Luis Obispo County. The Northern Chumash place name Petpatsu has been identified to be near or within the area of Los Osos. These peoples traditionally rely on the harvesting of fish and shellfish (e.g. Macoma nasuta) from Morro Bay, as well as the harvesting of acorns and vegetables from the surrounding areas. There is a large Northern Chumash archaeological site on a stabilized sand dune in Los Osos dating to at least as early as 1200 CE. The remains of two Northern Chumash people were removed from a site at Sweet Springs Nature Preserve dating to around 1700 BCE, and were later inventoried under NAGPRA and are possibly in the process of repatriation to the individuals' descendants. Cabrillo first encountered the Chumash in the year 1542. Today, Northern Chumash people are as of yet federally unrecognized, but continue to organize themselves under the Northern Chumash Tribal Council, which is headquartered in Los Osos.

On September 7 – 8, 1769, the Portolà expedition traveled through the San Luis Obispo area on his way to rediscover the Bay of Monterey. Finding an abundance of bears in the area, his diarist, Padre Juan Crespi, O.F.M., recorded that the name given the area by his soldiers was "Los Osos" (Spanish for "the bears"). Sources disagree about whether the rest of the Spanish name Crespi recorded was "llano" (plain) or "cañada" (glen).

The Portolà expedition was the beginning of a push by Spain to explore the northwestern frontier of Las Californias, and to establish both military outposts and missions. The move was intended to counter what were thought to be colonial designs by Russian traders from Alaska and the British fur companies in the Pacific Northwest. (See: Fort Ross, Russian-American Company, Hudson's Bay Company) The Portolà expedition was organized by the Visitadór Generál of New Spain, José de Gálvez, following up (belatedly) on previous maritime expeditions, most notably that of Sebastián Vizcaíno in 1602-3, who visited and described many points along the coast, including Monterey Bay, Portolà's primary destination.

Geography

There is a small business district concentrated in just a few blocks along Los Osos Valley Road, and several shops servicing the Baywood section of Los Osos, near the bay. The rest of the town is almost entirely residential. Its population is approximately 16,000 and total population at build-out is limited to approximately 26,000.

According to the United States Census Bureau, the CDP covers an area of 12.8 square miles (33.1 km2), 99.84% of it land, and 0.16% of it water.

Climate 

Los Osos experiences a mild warm-summer Mediterranean climate (Köppen Csb) characteristic of coastal California featuring dry, warm summers and wet, mild winters. The city is located next to the Pacific Ocean, which helps moderate temperatures and create an overall pleasant mild year-round climate, resulting in warmer winters and cooler summers compared with places farther inland, such as Atascadero.

Demographics
Los Osos was combined with the adjoining unincorporated area of Baywood Park to form the census-designated place of Baywood-Los Osos, but they were split into separate CDPs for the 2010 census. The 2010 United States Census reported that Los Osos had a population of 14,276. The racial makeup of Los Osos was 12,304 (86.2%) White, 79 (0.6%) African American, 97 (0.7%) Native American, 748 (5.2%) Asian, 18 (0.1%) Pacific Islander, 552 (3.9%) from other races, and 478 (3.3%) from two or more races. Hispanic or Latino of any race were 1,977 persons (13.8%).

The Census reported that 14,191 people (99.4% of the population) lived in households, 74 (0.5%) lived in non-institutionalized group quarters, and 11 (0.1%) were institutionalized.

There were 5,958 households, out of which 1,537 (25.8%) had children under the age of 18 living in them, 3,039 (51.0%) were opposite-sex married couples living together, 545 (9.1%) had a female householder with no husband present, 252 (4.2%) had a male householder with no wife present.  There were 315 (5.3%) unmarried opposite-sex partnerships, and 67 (1.1%) same-sex married couples or partnerships. 1,595 households (26.8%) were made up of individuals, and 717 (12.0%) had someone living alone who was 65 years of age or older. The average household size was 2.38.  There were 3,836 families (64.4% of all households); the average family size was 2.86.

The population was spread out, with 2,557 people (17.9%) under the age of 18, 1,162 people (8.1%) aged 18 to 24, 3,056 people (21.4%) aged 25 to 44, 4,827 people (33.8%) aged 45 to 64, and 2,674 people (18.7%) who were 65 years of age or older.  The median age was 47.2 years. For every 100 females, there were 95.5 males.  For every 100 females age 18 and over, there were 92.6 males.

The homeowner vacancy rate was 1.3%; the rental vacancy rate was 4.7%.  9,345 people (65.5% of the population) lived in owner-occupied housing units and 4,846 people (33.9%) lived in rental housing units.

Parks and wildlife 
The  Sweet Springs Nature Preserve is a notable natural areas in Los Osos.

Los Osos serves as the entrance to Montaña de Oro State Park. Los Osos Valley Road reaches the coast at the south end of Estero Bay and continues south into the state park. Morro Bay State Park borders the northeast of the town. The  Elfin Forest is on the southeast side of the estuary that lies between Los Osos and Morro Bay State Park.

Large groves of eucalyptus trees attract the annually migrating monarch butterflies to Los Osos.

Education

The Los Osos School District and school was founded in 1872. The one room schoolhouse was used until it closed in 1958. The restored schoolhouse is now located in the Los Osos Community Park. 
Los Osos is part of the San Luis Coastal Unified School District, and is served by these public schools:
 Elementary Schools: Baywood Elementary and Monarch Grove Elementary. A third elementary school, Sunnyside Elementary, has been closed and used for other educational purposes since 2004. 
 Middle Schools: Los Osos Middle School
 High Schools: Morro Bay High School in Morro Bay or San Luis Obispo High School in San Luis Obispo (Los Osos students are bused to this school in spite of the district generally eliminating high school bus service. )

Infrastructure

Transportation
There are two roads connecting Los Osos to other communities: South Bay Boulevard, which leads to Morro Bay via Highway 1, and Los Osos Valley Road, which leads to San Luis Obispo.

The San Luis Obispo Regional Transit Authority provides local service on a loop of the town, then express service to Morro Bay, Cuesta College and San Luis Obispo.

Due to Los Osos' proximity to the Diablo Canyon Power Plant, warning sirens are located throughout the town so that the residents will be warned if the power plant should suffer a meltdown or other adverse event.

Sewer system

Since 1983, a section of the community of Los Osos (Prohibition Zone) has been under a septic tank discharge prohibition, Resolution 83-13, issued by the Central Coast Regional Water Quality Control Board because that part of the town's septic tanks are too numerous and concentrated to dissipate nitrates. A building moratorium within the Prohibition Zone became effective in 1989 as part of the discharge prohibition. San Luis Obispo County was the original authority in charge of building the Wastewater Treatment System. Although the design of the County's selected project was nearly complete they were unable to bring the project to fruition. In July 1997, the County appeared before the California Coastal Commission to address an appeal of the construction permit for the project. Due to voiced opposition at the meeting from members of the Los Osos/Baywood Park Community, the Commission postponed its decision until a full hearing could be held. In 1998 an election was held to form the Los Osos Community Services District (LOCSD) by residents as a response to the high cost of the original sewer proposal. The original billing for the sewer of $50 a month in 1984 and is now (2010) estimated to exceed $200 a month with the current estimated cost of construction of the facilities and collection system to be well over $150 million before tax and interest. On January 1, 1999, the District was established and assumed responsibility for constructing the project.

There was also a controversy about where the sewer should be built. A location in the center of Los Osos (once known as the Tri-W site after the names of the previous owners of the property, now called the Mid-Town site), was chosen partly because of a desire for an additional park. The County, Planning Commission and the Coastal Commission approved a sewer at the site after hearing critics' claims.

In August 2005 the LOCSD began building a sewer at the Mid-Town site, contractors began work on the project and were advanced payments from a State Revolving Fund loan. Following a recall election which replaced the majority of the LOCSD board and enactment of an initiative measure that would require relocation of the project, the new board stopped construction of the sewer, and despite a letter warning them of severe consequences from the Regional Water Quality Control Board.

In October 2005, the LOCSD defaulted on a low interest State Revolving Fund loan. The state subsequently refused to disburse additional project funds and demanded immediate repayment of project funds that had dispersed. Project contractors filed lawsuits for more than $23 million in costs and lost profits. The Central Coast Regional Water Quality Control Board has used its enforcement powers to impose fines against the district in the amount of $6.6 million for violation of the discharge prohibition emanating from three LOCSD-owned sites. During February 2006 the Regional Water Quality Control Board, threatened it would begin to issue cease and desist orders to citizens of Los Osos, and may require recipients to pump their septic systems every three years, and to stop using them by 2011.

On August 25, 2006, the district filed for Chapter 9 bankruptcy protection in federal court. While the district had enough money to cover day-to-day needs, it did not have enough money to cover its legal fees and consultant fees. This action stayed the legal actions against the district related to money owed. Contractor lawsuits and other actions seeking monetary damages or claims against the district will be held in abeyance while the district addresses its financial situation. Subsequently, the LOCSD Bankruptcy Plan was approved in 2013. All claimants party to the bankruptcy were paid 45 cents on the dollar. The LOCSD, as the debtor of the Bankruptcy, was required to raise 2.5 million dollars to pay claimants by selling the LOCSD solid water franchise to the County of SLO.

Additionally, legislation has been approved by the California legislature that could return control of construction of the wastewater treatment facility to the County of San Luis Obispo but only after a due diligence period and a resolution by the County to accept the project. The legislation took the project away from the LOCSD. The LOCSD is still providing approximately one half of the town's drinking water, and is in charge of drainage, parks and recreation, street lighting, the contracting of fire, emergency and rescue services as well as solid waste services. The bill, AB 2701, was signed by the governor and went into effect January 1, 2007. A plan has been approved by the County Board of Supervisors, amended by the County Planning Commission pursuant to some of the objections raised by the community and its Community Advisory Council. The California Coastal Commission has denied the County a permit to proceed due to "Substantial Issues" that were cited during an appeals hearing. A De-Novo hearing is still pending. To date (April 2010) with more than $7 million spent the County has not voted to accept the project.

Since April 2010, the County of San Luis Obispo underwent the de Novo hearing referred to above. The project was approved by the California Coastal Commission and given permission to proceed with the project. The County officially accepted the project and construction commenced in early 2015. By November 2017 project construction was complete. To date, all but 210 property owners have connected to the sewer. The remaining few not connected are awaiting low interest loans from the government to proceed with connecting to the sewer. As of May 26, 2020 all property owners within the sewer project area have connected to the sewer.

Notable people
Art Clokey, famous for his stop motion clay animation like Gumby and Davey and Goliath.
Jerome Long, drafted by the Kansas City Chiefs in the 7th round in the 2012 NFL draft.
 Robert Osterloh, American actor.
Alma Ziegler, baseball player for the All-American Girls Professional Baseball League from 1944 to 1954.
Erik Lindmark, influential death metal musician and record label founder.

See also
 Amphibious Training Base Morro Bay used Los Osos during World War 2
 Elfin Forest Natural Area
 Los Osos Oaks State Natural Reserve
 Baywood-Los Osos, California

References

External links

Los Osos Community Services District
2000 Census profile for Los Osos

Census-designated places in San Luis Obispo County, California
Morro Bay
Populated coastal places in California
Unincorporated communities in San Luis Obispo County, California
Government units that have filed for Chapter 9 bankruptcy
Unincorporated communities in California